The Oregon Military Department is an agency of the government of the U.S. state of Oregon, which oversees the armed forces of the state of Oregon.  Under the authority and direction of the governor as commander-in-chief, the agency is responsible for planning, establishing, and enforcing rules and procedures governing the administration, supply, and training of the Oregon National Guard (consisting of the Oregon Army National Guard and the Oregon Air National Guard), when not in the active service of the United States. The Department also maintains all state-owned or leased military facilities, including posts, camps, military reservations, and rifle ranges.

Staff 
The adjutant general serves as the administrative director of the Military Department and is the military command officer of the national guard. The Military Council, composed of the adjutant general and six to ten officers of the National Guard, operates as an advisory staff to the governor, in much the same way as the Joint Chiefs of Staff advise the President. The Army and Air wings of the National Guard have proportional representation on the council according to their current total strength.

Structure 

The Oregon Military Department is split into the Oregon Army National Guard and the Oregon Air National Guard. The structure of units is listed below.

The Adjutant General and Command Staff, Salem, Oregon

State Agency Directory: Military Department

Oregon Army National Guard 

Land Component Command and General Staff, Salem, Oregon
 Headquarters and Headquarters Detachment (HHD) Salem, Oregon
 Recruiting and Retention Command, Salem, Oregon
 Medical Command, Salem, Oregon
 Regional Training Institute (RTI), Umatilla and Monmouth, Oregon
 Oregon Training Command, Warrenton, Adair, Biak, and Umatilla
The 41st Infantry Brigade Combat Team (United States) formerly The 41st Infantry Division (United States). The 41 IBCT is headquartered at Camp Withycombe, in Clackamas, Oregon.
 2nd Battalion, 162nd Infantry Regiment
 Headquarters and Headquarters Company Springfield
 Company A, Springfield
 Company B, Corvallis
 Company C, Gresham
 Company D, Hillsboro
 G Forward Support Company, 141st Brigade Support Battalion, Springfield
 1st Battalion, 186th Infantry Regiment
 Headquarters and Headquarters Company Ashland
 Company A, Medford
 Company B, Klamath Falls
 Company C, Roseburg
 Detachment 1, Coos Bay
 Company D, Grants Pass
 H Forward Support Company, 141st Brigade Support Battalion, Medford
 1st Battalion, 200th Infantry Regiment (New Mexico Army National Guard) (Las Cruces, New Mexico)
 Headquarters and Headquarters Company (Las Cruces)
 Company A, Rio Rancho
 Company B, Rio Rancho
 Company C, Las Cruces
 Detachment 1, Rio Rancho
 Company D, Alamogordo
 613th Forward Support Company, Las Cruces
 1st Squadron, 303rd Cavalry Regiment Headquartered in Washington
 Headquarters and Headquarters Troop Vancouver
 Troop A, Puyallup
 Troop B, Pasco
 Troop C, Centralia
 D Forward Support Company, 141st Brigade Support Battalion, Centralia
 2nd Battalion, 218th Field Artillery Regiment
 Headquarters and Headquarters Battery Forest Grove
 Battery A, Portland
 Battery B, McMinnville
 Battery C, Portland
 F Forward Support Company, 141st Brigade Support Battalion, Forest Grove
 741st Brigade Engineer Battalion
 Headquarters and Headquarters Company, Clackamas, Oregon
 Company A (Engineering), Clackamas
 Company B (Engineering), St. Helens
 Company C (Signal), Clackamas
 Company D (Military Intelligence), Clackamas
 E Forward Support Company, 141st Brigade Support Battalion, Clackamas
 141st Brigade Support Battalion
 Headquarters and Headquarters Company Portland
 Company A, Portland
 Company B (Ordnance), Portland
 Company C (Medical), Portland
The 82nd Troop Command Brigade, Clackamas, Oregon
 HHD 82 Troop Command Brigade, Clackamas, Oregon
 82 Tactical Support Detachment, Clackamas, Oregon
 821 Troop Command Battalion, Salem, Oregon
 Headquarters and Headquarters Detachment, 821 Troop Command Battalion
 1186 Military Police Company
 115th Mobile Public Affairs Detachment (MPAD) Salem, Oregon
 234 Army Band
 1942 Acquisition Team
 2-641 Aviation 641st Aviation Regiment (United States),Salem, Oregon
 Headquarters and Headquarters Company (HHC) 2-641 Aviation
 G/1-189 Aviation
 1/A/1-112 Aviation
 1/B/1-168 Aviation
 A(-) 641 Aviation
 3/B/351 Aviation
 Detachment 47 Operational Support Aircraft
 1/D/741 Brigade Engineer Battalion
 1249 Engineer Battalion, Salem, Oregon
 Headquarters and Headquarters Company (HHC) 1249 Engineers
 A Forward Support Company (FSC) 1249 Engineer
 224 Engineers (-) (Construction)
 442 Engineers (Construction)
 3-116 Cavalry, La Grande, Oregon
 Headquarters and Headquarters Company (HHC) 3-116 Cavalry
 A (Rifle)/3-116 Cavalry
 B (Rifle)/3-116 Cavalry
 C (Tank)/3-116 Cavalry
 D (Tank)/3-116 Cavalry
 F(-) 145 Brigade Support Battalion
 1-82 Cavalry, Bend, Oregon
 Headquarters and Headquarters Troop (HHT) 1-82 Cavalry
 A Troop 1-82 Cavalry
 B Troop 1-82 Cavalry
 C Troop 1-82 Cavalry
 D Troop 1-82 Cavalry
 D Company 181 Brigade Support Battalion

Oregon Air National Guard 

 Air Component Command and General Staff, Salem, Oregon
173rd Fighter Wing, Klamath Falls, Oregon
 173rd Operations Group
114th Fighter Squadron
 270th Air Traffic Control Squadron
 173rd Maintenance Group
 173rd Mission Support Group
 173rd Medical Group
142nd Wing, Portland, Oregon
 142nd Operations Group
116th Air Control Squadron, Camp Rilea AFTC, Warrenton
123rd Fighter Squadron
125th Special Tactics Squadron
 123rd Weather Flight
 142nd Maintenance Group
 142nd Mission Support Group
 142nd Medical Group

Funding 
Approximately 97 percent (US$382 million) of the funds for the Oregon National Guard are provided by the federal government. This does not reflect the considerably smaller figure of $35.9 million or 9% which is included within the Department's budget. The difference can be accounted for by the fact that troop salaries and wages are paid to them directly by the federal government. Federal funds support 100% of troop training, Defense Department programs, base security and fire protection, and youth programs; 75% of the logistical support for training sites; and most facility, maintenance and supply expenditures of the Air National Guard (averaging 75 to 85% based on a complex and variable schedule).

Role 

The National Guard Reserve is the only statewide civil defense organization of significant size and provides emergency assistance. It is composed entirely of unpaid volunteers. In the event of a federal call-up of the National Guard sufficient that it cannot fulfill its state role, domestic deployment of the reserve can be ordered. Since 1989 the Oregon National Guard Reserve (ORNGR) is known officially as the Oregon State Defense Force (ORSDF). The ORSDF is an all-volunteer militia force under the Oregon Military Department that provides reserve personnel to both the Oregon Army National Guard and the Oregon Air National Guard.  It is under state jurisdiction and its members are employed only within the State of Oregon.  It is not subject to any federal orders. Its mission is to provide units organized, equipped and trained in the protection of life or property and the preservation of peace, order and public safety under competent orders of State authorities.

As of just before the 10th anniversary of the September 11 terror attacks, 9,268 Oregon National Guard 
members had been deployed to Afghanistan (1,691), Iraq (7,048), and the Iraq Southern No Fly Zone (529) since 2002; 20 have been killed in action.

In April 2015, the Oregon Military Department suspended the Oregon State Defense Force. A spokesman for the OMD stated that the suspension was temporary and the ORSDF would return to active service. In December 2019, the ORSDF was reactivated under its current name: the Oregon Civil Defense Force.

Facilities 
The Military Department is based in Salem, with armories, camps, air bases and other facilities around the state. The Salem Armory Auditorium next to the Oregon State Fairgrounds in Salem is rented out as a concert venue, and for shows, conventions, graduations, dances and conferences.

See also 
 Air National Guard
 Camp Adair
 Camp Rilea Heliport
 Camp Withycombe
 U.S. National Guard
 Shepherds of Helmand

Directors/Commanders
Oregon National Guard
 Major General Michael E. Stencel 2015 - Present
 Major General Daniel R. Hokanson 2013 - 2015
 Major General Raymond F. Rees 2005 - 2013
 Brigadier General Raymond C. Byrne 2003 - 2005 (Acting)
 Major General Alexander H. Burgin 1999 - 2003
 Major General Raymond F. Rees 1994 - 1999
 Major General Gene A. Katke 1991 - 1994
 Major General Raymond F. Rees 1987 - 1991
 Major General Richard A. Miller 1973 -1987
 Major General Paul L. Kliever 1962 - 1963
 Major General Alfred E. Hintz 1959 - 1962
 Major General Thomas A. Rilea 1947 - 1959
 Brigadier General Raymond F. Olson 1944 - 1946 (Acting)
 Colonel Elmer V. Wooten 1941 - 1944 (Acting)
 Major General George A. White 1920 - 1941

Unified Oregon Militia/Oregon National Guard Era 1887-1920
 Conrad Stafrin 9 June 1919 - 15 Apr 1920
 Charles F. Beebe 1 Sep 1918 - 31 Mar 1919
 George A. White 1 Feb 1915
 William E Finzer 1 Sep 1903
 Calvin U. Gantenbein 1 Nov 1899
 Benjamin B. Tuttle 1 Apr 1895
 Robert W. Mitchell 12 Oct 1891
 James C. Shofner 30 Apr 1887

Oregon Community Militia Era 1847-1886
 George Williams 11 Mar 1886
 Rocky P. Earhart 10 Sep 1885
 Lyman S. Scott 24 May 1883
 Edward C. Cahalin 18 Nov 1878
 John Adair 1 Aug 1874
 Ami P. Dennison 15 Sep 1870
 Cyprus A. Reed 13 Nov 1862
 Eli M. Barnum 18 Apr 1854

First Adjutant General
 Asa L Lovejoy 27 December 1847

References

Further reading

References: Oregon State Defense Force, Oregon Revised Statutes (ORS) 399.035 2007 edition Chapter 399-Organized Militia

External links
Bibliography of Oregon Army National Guard History compiled by the United States Army Center of Military History
 Oregon Military Department (official website)
 Oregon State Defense Force (official website)
 Oregon Generals (official website)

Military in Oregon
Military Department